The barred fruiteater (Pipreola arcuata) is a species of bird in the family Cotingidae, found in Bolivia, Colombia, Ecuador, Peru, and Venezuela. Its natural habitat is subtropical or tropical moist montane forests.  The population is stable, and they are considered common.

Description

This bird is the largest of the fruiteaters and the only one with barred underparts in both sexes. The male has a glossy black head and throat, and the remainder of the upper parts is greenish-brown. The tail is tipped with black and the wings have large areas of yellowish spotting. The underparts are finely barred in black and pale yellow. The head, throat and upper parts of the female are entirely greenish-brown and the underparts are similar to those of the male. Birds at the northern end of the range have orange-red irises while those at the southern end are pale grey or olive. The legs and beak are orange-red. The song is a faint, high-pitched "seeeeeeeh".

Distribution
The barred fruiteater is native to mountainous parts of South America. It usually moves through the forest singly or in pairs, but at particularly fruitful trees, several birds may congregate.

Status
Pipreola arcuata has a very wide range and is common over much of that area. Its population seems to be steady, and the International Union for Conservation of Nature has assessed its conservation status as being of "least concern".

References

barred fruiteater
Birds of the Northern Andes
barred fruiteater
Taxonomy articles created by Polbot